Shaun Smith is an American special make-up effects supervisor and prop creator from Rockford, Illinois. His work portfolio includes major theatrical releases such as 300, Face/Off, Conan the Barbarian, I Am Legend, The Monkey King 3, Dawn of the Dead, Starship Troopers, and Chronicles of Narnia.

Films 

Smith has created prosthetic makeup and special effects for films including Exeter, The Monkey King (for which he spent nine months on set in China training over 100 crew members). He also worked as creature designer for the film Conan the Barbarian and as creature supervisor in addition to his makeup work in 300.

Partial filmography 

The Monkey King 3 (2018)
Eternal Wave (2017)
The Monkey King 2 (2016)
Hap and Leonard (TV series) (2016)
Exeter (2015)
The Monkey King (2014)
Eagleheart (TV series) (2013-2014)The Cabin in the Woods (2012)Conan the Barbarian (2011)The Forbidden Kingdom (2008)
I Am Legend (2007)300 (2006)
End of the Spear (2005)Dawn of the Dead (2004)

Awards 

Smith's work in 300 was nominated for Best Makeup at the 34th annual Saturn Awards, as well as recognized at the 80th Academy Awards "bakeoff". His work in Conan the Barbarian was also nominated in the 38th Saturn Awards.

References

External links 
 
Shaun Smith: Make-Up Effects Official Website

People from Rockford, Illinois
American make-up artists
Special effects people
Living people
Year of birth missing (living people)